The Fly River trumpet-eared bat (Kerivoula muscina) is a species of vesper bat in the family Vespertilionidae.
It is found only in Papua New Guinea.
Its natural habitat is subtropical or tropical dry forests.

References

Kerivoulinae
Bats of Oceania
Endemic fauna of Papua New Guinea
Mammals of Papua New Guinea
Taxonomy articles created by Polbot
Mammals described in 1941
Bats of New Guinea